Salvelinus mallochi is a species of fish of the family Salmonidae in the order Salmoniformes.

Habitat 
It lives in temperate freshwater habitats.

Geographical distribution 
It is located in the United Kingdom.

References

Bibliography 
 Fenner, Robert M.: The Conscientious Marine Aquarist. Neptune City, New Jersey, United States: T.F.H. Publications,2001.
 Helfman, G., B. Collette and D. Facey: The diversity of fishes. Blackwell Science, Malden, Massachusetts, United States, 1997.
 Hoese, D.F. 1986: . A M.M. Smith and P.C. Heemstra (eds.) Smiths' sea fishes. Springer-Verlag, Berlin, Germany.
 Maugé, L.A. 1986. A J. Daget, J.-P. Gosse and D.F.E. Thys van den Audenaerde (eds.) Check-list of the freshwater fishes of Africa (CLOFFA). ISNB Brussels; MRAC, Tervuren, Flanders; and ORSTOM, Paris, France. Vol. 2.
 Moyle, P. and J. Cech.: Fishes: An Introduction to Ichthyology, 4th edition, Upper Saddle River, New Jersey, United States: Prentice-Hall. Year 2000.
 Nelson, J.: Fishes of the World, 3rd edition. New York, United States: John Wiley and Sons. Year 1994.
 Wheeler, A.: The World Encyclopedia of Fishes, 2nd edition, London: Macdonald. Year 1985.

External links 
 Catalogue of Life
 AQUATAB

Fish described in 1909
mallochi
Freshwater animals of Europe